Akbarabad-e Mostowfi (also Romanized as Akbarābād-e Mostowfī; also known as Akbarābād) is a village in Borj-e Akram Rural District, in the Central District of Fahraj County, Kerman Province, Iran. At the 2006 census, its population was 299, in 69 families.

References 

Populated places in Fahraj County